Limnopolar Lake is one of the numerous freshwater lakes on the ice-free Byers Peninsula, Livingston Island in the South Shetland Islands, Antarctica. The feature is oval in shape, extending 175 m in southeast-northwest direction and 140 m in southwest-northeast direction.  It drains through a 2.7 km stream westwards into Osogovo Bay north of Point Smellie.

The lake's name derives from the extensive limnological research in the area carried out by the Spanish Antarctic programme.

Location
British mapping in 1968, detailed Spanish mapping in 1992, and Bulgarian mapping in 2005, 2009 and 2017.

Map
 Península Byers, Isla Livingston. Mapa topográfico a escala 1:25000. Madrid: Servicio Geográfico del Ejército, 1992.
 L. Ivanov et al. Antarctica: Livingston Island and Greenwich Island, South Shetland Islands. Scale 1:100000 topographic map. Sofia: Antarctic Place-names Commission of Bulgaria, 2005.
 L. Ivanov. Antarctica: Livingston Island and Greenwich, Robert, Snow and Smith Islands. Scale 1:120000 topographic map. Troyan: Manfred Wörner Foundation, 2009. 
 L. Ivanov. Antarctica: Livingston Island and Smith Island. Scale 1:100000 topographic map. Manfred Wörner Foundation, 2017.

References
 Limnopolar Lake. SCAR Composite Antarctic Gazetteer

Bodies of water of Livingston Island

Lakes of the South Shetland Islands
Spain and the Antarctic